Repeat After Me is the ninth studio album by Canadian country music group Family Brown. It was released in 1984 by RCA Records and includes the singles, "We Really Got a Hold on Love", "Repeat After Me", "Do You Know", and "Straight Forward Love Affair", which all charted on the RPM Country Tracks chart in Canada. The album won the award for Album of the Year at the 1984 Canadian Country Music Association Awards.

Track listing

References

1984 albums
Family Brown albums
RCA Records albums
Canadian Country Music Association Album of the Year albums